Marine Light Attack Helicopter Squadron 469 (HMLA-469) was a United States Marine Corps helicopter squadron consisting of AH-1 SuperCobra and AH-1Z Viper attack helicopters and UH-1Y Venom utility helicopters. The squadron was headquartered at Marine Corps Air Station Camp Pendleton in Southern California and fell under the command of Marine Aircraft Group 39 (MAG-39) and the 3rd Marine Aircraft Wing (3rd MAW). The squadron was activated on June 30, 2009 and deactivated on December 16 2022.

Mission
The mission of the HMLA is to support the Marine Air-Ground Task Force Commander by providing offensive air support, utility support, armed escort and airborne supporting arms coordination, day or night under all weather conditions during expeditionary, joint or combined operations.

History
Both aircraft crashed into the Pacific Ocean and all nine crewmembers in both aircraft were killed. The Coast Guard's HC-130 was searching for a missing boater while the Marine Corps' helicopter was heading towards a military training area in company with another Cobra and two CH-53E Super Stallions from Marine Corps Air Station Miramar.

See also

 United States Marine Corps Aviation
 List of active United States Marine Corps aircraft squadrons

References

External links
 

LA469